Rushmore is a 1999 soundtrack to the Wes Anderson film of the same name.

In the album's liner notes, it is explained that Anderson originally intended for the soundtrack to be almost entirely composed of songs by The Kinks. This concept changed during filming, until only one Kinks song remained on the album.

Track listing
 "Hardest Geometry Problem in the World" – Mark Mothersbaugh
 "Making Time" – The Creation
 "Concrete and Clay" – Unit 4 + 2
 "Nothin' in the World Can Stop Me Worryin' 'Bout That Girl" – The Kinks
 "Sharp Little Guy" – Mark Mothersbaugh
 "The Lad With the Silver Button" – Mark Mothersbaugh
 "A Summer Song" – Chad & Jeremy
 "Edward Appleby (In Memoriam)" – Mark Mothersbaugh
 "Here Comes My Baby" – Cat Stevens
 "A Quick One, While He's Away" – The Who
 "Snowflake Music" (from Bottle Rocket) – Mark Mothersbaugh
 "Piranhas Are a Very Tricky Species" – Mark Mothersbaugh
 "Blinuet" – Zoot Sims
 "Friends Like You, Who Needs Friends" – Mark Mothersbaugh
 "Rue St. Vincent" – Yves Montand
 "Kite Flying Society" – Mark Mothersbaugh
 "The Wind" – Cat Stevens
 "Oh Yoko!" – John Lennon
 ""Ooh La La"" – Faces
 "Margaret Yang's Theme" – Mark Mothersbaugh

Comedy-drama film soundtracks
1999 soundtrack albums